You Go to My Head is a 1938 song.

You Go to My Head may also refer to:

Albums
You Go to My Head (album), a 1956 album by Patti Page
You Go to My Head, a 1957 album by Billy Daniels
You Go to My Head, a compilation album by Billie Holiday
Set One: You Go to My Head, a 2005 album by David McAlmont
You Go to My Head, a 2012 album by Malene Mortensen
You Go to My Head, a 2000 album by Doug Raney

Other uses
You Go to My Head (film), 2017 romantic thriller film by Dimitri de Clercq